The National Basketball Conference was a regional-based basketball league in the Philippines formed in 2004. The league is sanctioned by the Philippine national sport association for basketball, the Samahang Basketbol ng Pilipinas. Teams are also sponsored by the local government and sponsors.
In 2008, it merged with the Mindanao Visayas Basketball Association (MVBA), and Third Force Inc. (TFI) to form the new Liga Pilipinas.

History
After the Metropolitan Basketball Association (MBA) folded up in 2002, the clamor for a regional basketball did not die down.

Several leagues with the community-based concept started to surface but none of them lasted.

On such league was the National Basketball League (NBL), owned and operated by the Basketball Association of the Philippines (BAP), the former Philippine basketball governing body.

In 2003, the BAP had asked the NBL group to give back the "National Basketball League" name and rights to the BAP. The NBL officials did so, regrouped, and came up with a new name: the  National Basketball Conference, a league totally independent of the BAP.

In 2004, the NBC played its first season  with 8 teams participating, forming two divisions, Northern (Baguio Cardinals, Forward Taguig, Laguna Springs and Batangas 29ers) and Southern (Iloilo Warriors, Tribu Sugbu-Cebu, Cagayan de Oro Stars, Ozamiz Cotta). It still adopted the MBA's Home and Away format, but introduced the "Road Swing" wherein which cross-division contests required a team to tackle all its opposition in one road trip (usually lasting a little more than one week). This formula was drawn up by then Basketball Operations chief Noel Zarate, who was also the voice behind the original NBC broadcasts. The opening game featured a matchup between the visiting Iloilo Warriors against the Cagayan de Oro Stars. The game went into double overtime with the visitors prevailing 114–110. Iloilo's Carlos Sayon registered 30 points in the win. Tribu Sugbo (then owned by businessmen Lito Gillamac and Albert Tan and coached by former PBA player Al Solis) defeated Forward Taguig (owned by Taguig Freddie Tinga and coached by former FEU mentor Danny Gavieres) in a thrilling three-game series to cop the first NBC National Championship. Egay Echavez of Ozamiz was the first league MVP.

In 2005, new teams joined the league that included the Parañaque Jets, who made headlines by defeating the Basketball Association of the Philippines-sponsored RP-Cebuana Lhuillier Team in the NBC Preseason tournament. The Jets, though, failed to make the playoffs as the Ozamiz Cotta won the championship.

For the 2006 season, new expansion team joined the league, Pagadian Explorers of Mayor Sammy S. Co, the tournament was divided into two conferences, similar to the format used by the Philippine Basketball Association and the Philippine Basketball League. Ozamiz Cotta won the first conference title in Game 3 against the expansion team Pagadian Explorers, the first ever expansion team in league history to reach finals, while the second conference is also won by Ozamis Cotta via sweep against the Batang Tagaytay Springs.

For the 2007 season, a new team joined the league, GenSan-MP Pacman Warriors of boxing legend Manny "Pacman" Pacquiao from General Santos. The League has its TV partners the 24-hour Basketball TV and Viva Prime Channel.

In 2008, it merged with the Mindanao Visayas Basketball Association (MVBA), and Third Force Inc. (TFI) to form the new Liga Pilipinas.

Teams

(Last NBC Season-2007)

Other Teams
Parañaque Jets
Baguio Cardinals/Lions
Forward Taguig
Laguna Springs
Laguna Pistons
Batangas 29ers
Tribu Sugbu-Cebu
Cagayan de Oro Stars
Arthro Kontra Arthritis-Cebu
Osmena-Cebu
Harbour Centre-Bacchus-Manila
Mandaue (Mantawi) Sparkling Knights
Zamboanga del Norte (ZaNorte) Hornbills
Zamboanga Latinos
North Cotabato Braves

Teams Competed During NBL Era
M.Lhuillier Kwarta Padala-Cebu
Compak-Shineway-Ozamiz Cotta
Ilocos Sur Snipers
Grachiya-Adamson Falcons
Spring Cooking Oil-Malabon
Forward Taguig
Mail and More-Restolax-MayniLA
Pampanga Bulls/Sulpicio Lines-Pampanga
Spring Cooking Oil-Sta. Rosa Seven Lakers

Important people

Officers
President
Nathaniel “Tac” Padilla (Olympian and owner of Spring Oil)
Vice President
Bambol Tolentino
Secretary-General
Tito Palma (former commissioner of NBL)

Players
Raffy Dalino (Laguna Springs)
Nelson Asaytono (Pagadian Explorers) (former PBA player)
Robin Mendoza (Quezon-Villa Anita) (former PBA player)
John Laborte (Toyota-Iloilo Warriors)
Marlon Legaspi (Osmena-Cebu) (former PBA player)
Britt Reroma (Bacchus-Harbour Centre-Manila)
Elbert Alberto (Pagadian Explorers)
Ruel Bravo (North Cotabato Braves) (former PBA player)
Romulo Marata (Iligan Crusaders)
Nathaniel Cruz (Iligan Crusaders/Valencia Golden Harvest)
Ian Saladaga (Iligan Crusaders/Valencia Golden Harvest)
Ferdinand Go (Iligan Crusaders) (former PBL player)
Ollan Omiping (Bacchus-Harbour Centre-Manila/Iligan Crusaders)
Christian Nicdao (Ozamiz Cotta/Iligan Crusaders) (former PBA player)
Marlon Kalaw (Laguna Springs/Tagaytay Springs/Iligan Crusaders)
Carlos Sayon (Toyota-Iloilo Warriors) (former MBA Player)
Egay Echavez (Ozamiz Cotta) (former PBA/MBA player)
Marvin Poloyapoy (Montana Pawnshop-Davao)
John Gonzaga (Montana Pawnshop-Davao)
Apol Coronado (MP PacMan-Gensan Warriors)
Bruce Dacia (Tribu Sugbu-Cebu) (former PBA/MBA player)
Mark Ababon (Tribu Sugbu-Cebu)
and many others

NBC champions
 2004: Tribu Sugbu
 2005: Ozamiz Cotta
 2006:
 First Conference: Ozamiz Cotta
 Second Conference: Ozamiz Cotta
 2007:
National Cup: Iligan Crusaders

Media coverage
National Basketball Conference games are broadcast via Basketball TV and Prime Channel

External links
Official website of the National Basketball Conference

Liga Pilipinas
Defunct basketball leagues in the Philippines